Plaza Venezuela is a Caracas Metro station on Lines 1 and 3. The Line 1 station was opened on 27 March 1983 as part of the extension of the line from La Hoyada to Chacaíto. The station is between Colegio de Ingenieros and Sabana Grande.

The Line 3 station was opened on 18 December 1994 as the northern terminus of the inaugural section of the line, from Plaza Venezuela to El Valle. The adjacent station is Ciudad Universitaria.

The name of the station originates from nearby Plaza Venezuela.

References

Caracas Metro stations
1983 establishments in Venezuela
Railway stations opened in 1983